The 2007 season was the sixteenth full year of competitive football in the Baltic country as an independent nation. The Estonia national football team played a total number of fifteen matches in 2007 and did not qualify for Euro 2008 in Austria and Switzerland.

Poland vs Estonia

Slovenia vs Estonia

Estonia vs Russia

Israel vs Estonia

Estonia vs Estonia U-21

Estonia vs Croatia

Estonia vs England

Estonia vs Andorra

Croatia vs Estonia

FYR Macedonia vs Estonia

England vs Estonia

Estonia vs Montenegro

Saudi Arabia vs Estonia

Andorra vs Estonia

Uzbekistan vs Estonia

Notes

References
RSSSF detailed results

2007
2007 national football team results
National